The Kavkazsky otdel was a Cossack district (otdel) of the Kuban oblast of the Caucasus Viceroyalty of the Russian Empire. It bordered the Yeysky otdel to the north, the Tamansky otdel to the west, the Yekaterinodarsky and Maykopsky otdels to the south, and the Stavropol Governorate to the east. The area of the Kavkazsky otdel mostly corresponded to the contemporary Krasnodar Krai region of the Russian Federation. The district was eponymously named for its administrative center, Kavkazskaya.

Administrative divisions 
The subcounties (uchastoks) of the Kavkazsky otdel in 1912 were as follows:

Demographics

Russian Empire Census 
The majority of the population indicated Russian to be their mother tongue, with a significant Ukrainian speaking minority.

Kavkazskiy kalendar 

Notes

References

Bibliography 

Otdels of Kuban Oblast
Kuban Oblast
Caucasus Viceroyalty (1801–1917)
History of Kuban